Kavelan or Kavlan may refer to:
 Kavelan-e Olya
 Kavelan-e Sofla